Ballyteague GFC is a Gaelic football club in Kilmeage, County Kildare, Republic of Ireland, club of the year in 1980, winners of junior, and intermediate in successive years 1972-1973 and senior finalists in 1974.

History
RIC records from 1890 show that Boherkill and Kilmoney club had 50 members with officers listed as Edward Delaney, Edward Loughlin, and John Flynn senior and junior listed as officers. Ballyteague affiliated 1927–51, founded by Mick Behan, Paddy Nugent and Jack Gilligan while Dinny Dunny, father of Pat, was one of the original players. The original colours were vertical stripes of red and green.

Gaelic football
After re-affiliating in 1951, Ballyteague won Junior B in 1962. Joe McTeague, Seamus Brennan, Martin Nugent, John Jacob and later Tommy Herbert spearheaded their from junior to senior in three years. Their introduction to senior football was an eight-point win over Round Towers and they then eliminated Clane and played a memorable three-game semi-final saga against area side St. Wolstan's. At half time in the 1974 county final they were 0-5 to 0-1 ahead against Carbury, but failed to score in the second half and lost 2-9 to 0–5. When they were promoted to senior again after 1991 they beat Sarsfields and Round Towers in the championship. The club stages the popular Herbert Cup tournament. Famous supporters include Pat Nevin (former Everton Great) and Tom Doyle who once quoted "Are you bringin on a sub or what?"

 Kildare Senior Football Championship Finalists 1974
 Kildare Intermediate Football Championship: 1973, 1991, 2022
 Kildare Junior A Football Championship 1972, 1988
 Kildare Junior B Football Championship: (1) 1962
 Kildare Intermediate Football League: (1) 1967
 Kildare Football League Division 2: (1) 1972
 Kildare Football League Division 3: Winners (3) 2002, 2015, 2018
 Kildare Junior Football League: (2) 1928, 1979
 Kildare Minor Football League: (1) 1981
 Kildare Under 14 Division 2 Football Championship: (1) 2004
 Kildare Under 14 Kildare Football Feile B: (1) 2004
 Kildare Intermediate B Football Championship: (2) 2005, 2007
 Kildare Under 12 Football Championship: (1) 2007
 Kildare Reserve E Football Championship: (2) 2017, 2022

Bibliography
 Kildare GAA: A Centenary History, by Eoghan Corry, CLG Chill Dara, 1984,  hb  pb
 Kildare GAA yearbook, 1972, 1974, 1978, 1979, 1980 and 2000- in sequence especially the Millennium yearbook of 2000
 Soaring Sliothars: Centenary of Kildare Camogie 1904-2004 by Joan O'Flynn Kildare County Camogie Board.

External links
Kildare GAA site
Kildare GAA club sites
Kildare on Hoganstand.com

Gaelic games clubs in County Kildare
Gaelic football clubs in County Kildare